Basman is a district of the city of Amman, Jordan.

It is Amman's most populous district, located just north of the historical city,  with a population of 374,000 as of 2015.

See also
Greater Amman Municipality

References

External links
ammancity.gov.jo

Districts of Amman